The Way Back Home is the second studio album by American country music artist Vince Gill. It was released in 1987 by RCA Nashville and it produced four chart singles on the Billboard country charts. In order of release, these were "Cinderella" (No. 5), "Let's Do Something (No. 16), "Everybody's Sweetheart" (No. 11) and "The Radio" (No. 39). After the final single, Gill left RCA's roster in favor of MCA Nashville, where in 1989 he released his fourth album, When I Call Your Name.

Track listing

Production 
 Producer – Richard Landis
 Recorded by Csaba Petocz
 Additional recording by Joe Bogan and John Vigran
 Recording Assistants – Jeff DeMorris, Richard McKeinon and Dennis Ritchie.
 Recorded at Conway Studios (Hollywood, CA) and The Village Recorder (Los Angeles, CA).
 Overdubbed by Jim Dineen
 Mixed by Ed Thacker
 Overdubbed and Mixed at The Grey Room (Hollywood, CA).
 Mastered by Wally Traugott at Capitol Studios (Hollywood, CA).
 Art Direction – Mary Hamilton 
 Design – John Coulter Design 
 Photography and Hand Tinting by Dennis Keely
 Management – Fitzgerald Hartley Co.

Reissue Credits
 Producer – Mike Ragogna
 Mastered by Elliott Federman
 Archivists – Claudia Depkin, Joanne Feltman and Glenn Korman.

Personnel 
 Vince Gill – lead and backing vocals, acoustic guitars, electric guitars, banjo, dobro, mandolin
 Philip Aaberg – pianos 
 Randy Kerber – pianos 
 Richard Landis – synthesizers, percussion 
 Jim Lang – synthesizers 
 Alan Pasqua – synthesizers
 George Doering – electric guitars 
 Reed Nielson – acoustic guitar (3), backing vocals (3)
 JayDee Maness – pedal steel guitar
 Leland Sklar – bass guitar 
 Neil Stubenhaus – bass guitar 
 Roy Huskey, Jr. – upright bass
 Carlos Vega – drums 
 Leonard Arnold – percussion 
 Byron Berline – fiddle
 Charlie Calello – rhythm arrangements
 Kristine Arnold – backing vocals
 Rosanne Cash – backing vocals
 Joe Chemay – backing vocals
 Rodney Crowell – backing vocals
 Kevin Dorsey – backing vocals
 Kenny Edwards – backing vocals 
 Janis Gill – backing vocals
 Andrew Gold – backing vocals
 Jim Haas – backing vocals
 Emmylou Harris – backing vocals
 Bonnie Raitt – backing vocals
 Jerry Whitman – backing vocals

Chart performance

References

1987 albums
Albums produced by Emory Gordy Jr.
Vince Gill albums
RCA Records albums
Albums produced by Richard Landis